The Saurer 10DM is the last heavy truck model, which was manufactured by the Adolph Saurer AG.

The name 10DM stands for 10 t payload. The three-axle vehicle has a power output of 320 hp. The driving Formula 6x6 is driven 6 of 6 existing wheels. Its lighter "brother", the Saurer 6DM, has accordingly 2 axes (4-Wheel) and a 6 tonne payload and 280 hp.

The vehicles are equipped with Saurer six-cylinder engines and turbochargers are connected via a semi-automatic transmission.
Some of the 6DM and 10DM are equipped with a winch,  the 6DM and 10DM with a winch have a 60l less fuel capacity.

The models 6DM and 10DM were the first military vehicles of the Swiss Army, which went into operation with NATO structure. The most widespread are the 6DM and 10DM truck as flatbed with tarp for troops and supplies, but they also exist as fire engines for military airfields.  The firefighting version practice the firefighting with the special F/A-18C Maquette device, as a crane truck, and as container transporter for the operating components for TAFLIR (tactical aircraft radar) also TAFLIR radar antennae are mounted on 10DM trucks.

As these trucks have reached the end of their useful life and spare parts are getting scarce, they are being phased out and are replaced by trucks from Iveco since 2013.

References 

 6DM
 10DM
Swissmotor German only
Fahrzeuge der Schweizer Armee by Markus Hofmann (2000)

External links

Fotos von Original 10DM und Modell 1:14 inkl. Geländeeinsatz
 Photos of Saurer 10DM

Military trucks of Switzerland
Off-road vehicles
Fire service vehicles